John Sugden (died 20 June 1897) was a bishop of the Free Church of England. He was consecrated by Edward Cridge and others on 20 August 1876 in Christ Church, Lambeth.

See also 
 List of bishops of the Reformed Episcopal Church

References 

 

1897 deaths
Bishops of the Reformed Episcopal Church
Year of birth missing